The Oxford Old English Game is an ancient breed of chicken, originating from Britain. They were officially recognised when The Old English Game Club split, creating two breeds of Old English Game fowl. They are primarily farmed for meat but have been used for cock fighting and eggs on a domestic scale.

History
The breed was first mentioned in the middle ages, when the English nobility selectively bred them for cockfighting. The Old English Game has been recognised in Great Britain since the 19th Century and is thought to be a descendant of the ancient fighting cocks. It is likely that they were the first selectively bred breed of chicken in Britain for fighting purposes. To prevent damage during fights, the comb and wattles were removed. This also gave the birds a more aggressive appearance. This practise is known as dubbing. Cockfighting has been banned in Britain since 1849, the breed is still popular as an ornamental fowl and a domestic chicken.

When The Old English Game Club split in the 1930s two types of Old English Game were created, The Carlisle and The Oxford. The Carlisle has different qualities from the Oxford, such as being heavier, having a larger breast and a horizontal back.

Characteristics
The Oxford Old English Game has a back angled 45° towards the ground and has approximately 30 different colour varieties. It is a small bird with many feathers on the plumage. The head is small with a big, strong beak, single comb, small thin earlobes and wattles with large eyes. The wings have a large surface area and the bird's legs are and short. They have four toes ending in long, curved nails that need to be trimmed often. The bird has a very even muscle distribution and has been described as being 'an excellent table bird'. A quarter-sized bantam exists. This bantam breed is the smallest bantam that exists.

Uses
The bird lays eggs moderately well, compared to other birds of similar proportions. The bird is also primarily reared for meat. Traditionally, the bird was used for cockfighting but this is no longer practised in Britain. However, many other countries continue with cockfighting, and Old Oxford English Game is commonly used.

References

Chicken breeds
Chicken breeds originating in the United Kingdom